The Rockhampton Showgrounds is a multipurpose recreational venue in Rockhampton, Queensland, Australia. It is situated in the suburb of Wandal.

History 
It was opened in its current location in 1886 by the Fitzroy Pastoral, Agricultural and Horticultural Society, replacing an earlier showground in William Street. The plan for the new showground venue in Wandal, at a cost of £2000, was approved in December 1885.

Facilities 
Since its opening in 1886, the venue has undergone numerous upgrades, improvements and additions.

The Rockhampton Showgrounds currently encompasses numerous pavilions, grandstands and buildings which are located around the perimeter of the main show ring. They include the Walter Pierce Pavilion, the James Lawrence Pavilion, the Robert Schwarten Pavilion, the Kele Pavilion, the McCamley Pavilion and the Robert Archer Grandstand.

Events 
Annual, biennial and triennial events which are held at the Rockhampton Showgrounds include:
Rockhampton Agricultural Show
Beef Australia
Rocky Swap
Lifeline Bookfest
Taste of the World Festival
Rockhampton Expo
CQ Sports and Health Expo
Exercise Talisman Sabre Open Day
Handmade Expo
Former Origin Greats Indigenous Employment and Careers Expo

The showgrounds has also been used for many years as a local speedway with motorcycle racing having been held since 1925.

Concerts are regularly held at the Rockhampton Showgrounds. Johnny Cash, John Denver, Australian Crawl, Split Enz, Cold Chisel, Powderfinger, You Am I, Amy Shark, Timberwolf, Busby Marou, Troy Cassar-Daley and Fanny Lumsden are some of the notable artists to have performed at the Rockhampton Showgrounds..

Noise and dust complaints 
The noise created by concert and speedway events held at the Rockhampton Showgrounds has generated numerous complaints from residents living near the venue.

In an attempt to appease local residents, a 10:30 pm curfew was imposed for event organisers. The decision to lift the curfew for selected events, however, has also been met with criticism. The ongoing noise complaints generated from events held at the Rockhampton Showgrounds has prompted discussions about moving the venue out of the city and away from the residential area in Wandal.

Notable events 
In 1912, American aviator Arthur Burr Stone used the Rockhampton Showgrounds to demonstrate flight with his Blériot monoplane.

In 1927, the finals scenes of what is believed to be Australia's last silent film, The Kid Stakes were filmed at the Rockhampton Showgrounds.

In 1996, a prize bull escaped from its handlers at the Rockhampton Agricultural Show and charged a lunchtime crowd at the showgrounds resulting in some injuries to attendees.

In 2018, two prison inmates from the Capricornia Correctional Centre escaped from the Rockhampton Showgrounds where they were completing a community work order. They were both later captured separately in Mackay.

In mid-2018, a dispute arose between the Rockhampton Agricultural Society and the Showmen's Guild of Australasia over space allocation at the venue for the wood-chopping contest at the Rockhampton Show. The disagreement prompted the showmen to boycott the Rockhampton Show leaving the event at the showgrounds without any of the regular sideshow alley amusements. The guild instead established their own rival event at Callaghan Park on the other side of the Fitzroy River, held simultaneously in direct competition with the Rockhampton Show.

In late-2018, two Rockhampton Regional Council councillors voiced their objections to a decision to relocate the popular steampunk convention CapriCon from the library precinct in the city centre to the Rockhampton Showgrounds.  Proponents for the move believe the event had grown in such popularity since its inception that a move to the Rockhampton Showgrounds was essential for the event as it offered larger venue space, improved security and increased accessibility.

References 

Buildings and structures in Rockhampton
Showgrounds in Australia